The 3rd Carrier Air Group of the Royal Navy's Fleet Air Arm was formed on 2 August 1945. It was a spare air group for the British Pacific Fleet based at HMAS Albatross, Australia. It was formed too late for service in the war, and it contained 854 Naval Air Squadron flying the Grumman TBF Avenger, 1843 Naval Air Squadron and 1845 Naval Air Squadron flying the Vought F4U Corsair. It was disbanded on 20 October 1945, and its personnel returned to the United Kingdom on board a merchant ship.

See also
 List of Fleet Air Arm groups

References

Citations

Bibliography

Fleet Air Arm groups
Military units and formations established in 1945
Military units and formations disestablished in 1945
1945 disestablishments in Japan